The Six Days of Atlantic City was a six-day cycling event, held in Atlantic City, New Jersey. Two editions of the event were held; the first in 1909 and the second in 1932, won by track stars William Peden and Franco Giorgetti.

Roll of honor

Notes

Full results

1932
1. William "Torchy" Peden (Can) - Franco Giorgeti (Ita) 1208 points
2. Reginald McNamara (Aus) - Xavier Van Slembroeck (Usa) 592 à 2 tours
3. Alfred Crossley (Usa) - Louis Cohen (Usa) 537
4. Laurent Gadou (Can) - Harry Horan (Usa) 757 à 3 tours
5. Willy Grimm (Usa) - Henri Lepage (Can) 653
6. Robert Walthour junior (Usa) - Norman Hill (Usa) 540
7. Dave Lands (Usa) - Anthony Beckman (Usa) 550 à 5 tours

References

Cycle races in the United States
International cycle races hosted by the United States
Six-day races
1909 in track cycling
1932 in track cycling
Defunct cycling races in the United States
Sports in Atlantic City, New Jersey
1909 in New Jersey
1932 in New Jersey